The 2014–15 Oberliga Niederrhein was the 59th season of the Oberliga Niederrhein, one of three state association league systems in the state of North Rhine-Westphalia, covering its northwestern part. It was the third season of the league as a fifth level of the German football league system.

League table 
The league featured four new clubs for the 2014–15 season with 1. FC Bocholt, VfR Krefeld-Fischeln and VdS Nievenheim promoted from the Landesliga Niederrhein while SSVg Velbert had been relegated from the Regionalliga West.

Top goalscorers 
The top goal scorers:

Promotion round
The runners-up of the three divisions of the Landesliga Niederrhein competed for one more spot in the Oberliga for the following season, with each team playing the other just once:

References

External links 
 

2014–15 Oberliga
2014-15